EXR may refer to:

 ExR, an English musical duo
 EXR (clothing), a South Korean clothing company
 Exeter station (New Hampshire), a train station
 Essex Road railway station, London, UK
 OpenEXR, an image file format